Disodium octaborate is a borate of sodium, a chemical compound of sodium, boron, and oxygen — a salt with elemental formula  or , also written as . It is a colorless crystalline solid, soluble in water.

Disodium octaborate is traded either as a liquid concentrate, or as the tetrahydrate , a white odorless powder. It is used as an insecticide, and as a fungicide and algicide, and as a fire retardant., and as a boron micronutrient additive in fertilizers. Trade names include Bora-Care, Borathor, Termite Prufe, Board Defense, Polybor, Tim-bor, and Can-Bor.

Preparation
The anhydrous form can be crystallized from a molten mixture of sodium oxide  and boric oxide .

Properties

Solubility
The salt dissolves in water to form forms viscous supersaturated solutions at elevated temperatures.

Structure
The anhydrous salt exists in two stable crystalline forms, α and β.

The α form has monoclinic crystal structure, with the P21/a space group. The unit cell parameters at 273 K are: a = 650.7 pm, b = 1779 pm, c = 837.7 pm, β = 96.6 °, Z = 4. The structure contains two interlocking boron-oxygen frameworks, each of them consisting of alternating single and double rings composed of two triangles and a tetrahedron, the so called triborate and pentaborate groups. The two frameworks are connected by two (non-equivalent) sodium atoms, each surrounded by 8 oxygens, comprising finite chains of four  polyhedra with shared edges. The thermal expansion is sharply anisotropic, including negative thermal expansion. The thermal expansion tensor in 273–1000 K in function of absolute temperature T has α11 = 55–0.042T, α22 = 11, α33 = -15 + 0.032T (×10–6) K–1, μ = (c^α33) = 42°.

The β form has monoclinic crystal structure, with the P21/c space group. The unit cell parameters are a = 1173.1 pm, b = 788.0 pm, c = 1041.0 pm, β = 99.883 °, Z = 4. The structure consists of two infinite, independent, and interleaved boron–oxygen networks containing a complex borate anion  formed by six  triangles (Δ) and two  tetrahedra (T), which can be viewed as a  group linked to a  group. This fundamental building block is identical to that of the α form and of silver octaborate , with some subtle differences.

Uses
Dilute solutions of disodium octaborate are sprayed on wood surfaces to kill termites, powder post beetles, carpenter ants, fungi and algae. The tetrahydrate is also available as pellets for embedding in structural wood. Compared to other chemicals used for these purposes, it has the advantages of lack of odor, permanent effect, and low toxicity to humans and pets.

The compound was also shown to significantly reduce dust mite populations in the home when applied as a dilute solution to carpets and upholstery together with regular vacuum cleaning.

Disodium octaborate, applied to the soil or foliar spray, has been shown to inhibit pests of crops such as tomato and pistachio, with no observed detrimental effects to the plants.

Safety
Disodium octaborate is not flammable, combustible, or explosive and has low acute oral and dermal toxicity. The oral 50% lethal doses (LD50) are 5.3 g/kg for guinea pig, 2g/kg for rats. However, it is classified as "reproductive toxicity category 1B (presumed human reproductive toxicant)" under the EU Classification, Labelling and Packaging Regulation (CLP Regulation). The CLP hazard code and statement are "H360FD: May damage fertility. May damage the unborn child."

On 22 February 2018, the Swedish Chemicals Agency (KEMI) submitted a proposal to the European Chemicals Agency (ECHA) to list disodium borate as a Substance of Very High Concern (SVHC) under the Registration, Evaluation, Authorisation and Restriction of Chemicals (REACH) Regulation.

References

Borates
Sodium compounds